Expm or expm may refer to:

 expm1, an abbreviation for the exponent minus 1 function in some Hewlett-Packard RPL scientific calculators
 Matrix exponential, the generalization of the exponential function to matrices.